Belgium has gradually developed from a unitary state to a federal state. Following a 6th round of state reforms, the power and responsibility to set speed limits has been handed over from the federal government to the autonomous regional governments.  Since 2017 different general speed limits apply for different regions. Not having the same speed limit applied to the whole country is a unique situation in Europe.

Speed limits in Belgium are as follows:

30 km/h (19 mph) in the entire Brussels-Capital Region, with the exception of certain main axes with dedicated higher speed limitation panels 
50 km/h (31 mph) within built-up areas;
70 km/h (43 mph) outside built-up areas in the Flemish Region and Brussels-Capital Region;
90 km/h (56 mph) outside built-up areas in the Wallonia region;
120 km/h (75 mph) on roads with at least two two-lane roadways separated by a median, and on freeways.

 Since 1 January 2017.

The limits shown above apply only if there are no other signs present, as the signs may prescribe a lower or a higher speed limit. The speed limit outside built-up areas in the Wallonia region can be restricted to 70 km/h, as well as the posted speed limit outside built-up areas in the Flemish Region can be 90 km/h. Around almost all schools, 30 km/h (19 mph) zones are found.

Speed limit on trunk roads in Flanders 

Flanders is notorious for its poor urban planning and lots of ribbon developments, where the function of a through-traffic-road often gets into conflict with the function of a residential street. Therefore, Flanders had exceptional 70 km/h speed limit signs on almost every stretch of road  before 70 km/h became the general speed in Flanders in 2017 and speed limit information signs for Vlaanderen (Flanders), as seen in the image in the upper right corner of this page, had to be set up at all borders, including the regional border with Wallonia. The 70 km/h signs have since been removed almost entirely in all of Flanders.

Speed limit on trunk roads in Wallonia 

To a lesser extent, linear settlements can also be found in Wallonia north of Sambre and Meuse rivers, where lots of 70 km/h signs still stand at dangerous stretches of road and at dangerous road crossings. Since Wallonia is far less densely populated than Flanders, they kept their general out-of-town speed limit at 90 km/h.

Speed on expressways and motorways 

Especially in Flanders, the speed limit on roads with at least two two-lane roadways separated by a median is very often reduced to a maximum of 90 km/h (sometimes even to 70 km/h), where they would be 120 km/h without any traffic sign. Please bear in mind that on roads like N4 between Namur and Bastogne, or N5 between Charleroi and Couvin, long stretches of dual carriageway are accessible to tractors going no faster than 30 km/h or 40 km/h, even if the maximum speed is set at 120 km/h. If no signs block access, in theory one could ride a bicycle on a dual carriageway without a hard shoulder, where traffic drives 120 km/h, but one would risk to get killed in an accident, if doing so.

Speed limits and traffic calming in Brussels 

On the Brussels orbital motorway R0, the speed limit has been lowered to 100 km/h.  Some feeder motorways coming from the R0 and leading into Brussels, like E40/A3, A201, A12 and E40/A10, had their number of lanes reduced and were converted into urban boulevards with a speed limit of 50 km/h.  All of Brussels district has become a 30 km/h zone except for some through traffic boulevards, which can be seen in the map in this reference.

Speed limits for cyclists 

A proposal to introduce a speed limit of 30 km/h for cyclists has caused heated debate in 2014. It remains unknown if this was an early April fools joke, or a serious proposal.  Police forces in the city of Ronse, in an area where cyclists love to race up and down hills, have actually started to give fines to cyclists breaking the speed limit.

External weblinks 

 Royal Decree of 1 December 1975, Title II: Rules for using public roads, Article 11. Speed limits (in Dutch)
 Road traffic rules in English Speed limits in Belgium, in English, with traces of French original text shimmering through

References

Belgium
Law of Belgium
Transport in Belgium